The Doddridge County Courthouse in West Union, Doddridge County, West Virginia, USA, was designed in the Victorian Romanesque style by J. Charles Fulton, who also designed courthouses in Barbour County and Randolph County.  Built in 1899 by contractor John B. Conn, the courthouse features stone carvings by  James Grant. The courthouse replaced a previous courthouse that was destroyed by fire in 1898.

References

Courthouses on the National Register of Historic Places in West Virginia
Government buildings completed in 1899
Buildings and structures in Doddridge County, West Virginia
County courthouses in West Virginia
Romanesque Revival architecture in West Virginia
Victorian architecture in West Virginia
Clock towers in West Virginia
National Register of Historic Places in Doddridge County, West Virginia
1899 establishments in West Virginia